Statistics of Empress's Cup in the 2011 season.

Overview
It was contested by 32 teams, and INAC Kobe Leonessa won the championship.

Results

1st round
Jumonji High School 2-2 (pen 5–4) Fujieda Junshin High School
AC Nagano Parceiro 1-4 Kanto Gakuen University
Ehime FC 5-0 Hokkaido Bunkyo University Meisei High School
Osaka University of Health and Sport Sciences 2-1 Japan Soccer College
Tokuyama University 2-1 Shizuoka Sangyo University
Musashigaoka College 0-3 Kibi International University
Himeji Dokkyo University 1-3 Norddea Hokkaido
Sendai University 1-2 Mashiki Renaissance Kumamoto FC

2nd round
Waseda University 6-2 Jumonji High School
Kanto Gakuen University 0-3 AS Elfen Sayama FC
Je Vrille Kagoshima 0-1 Ehime FC
Osaka University of Health and Sport Sciences 2-4 Tokiwagi Gakuken High School
Hoo High School 4-2 Tokuyama University
Kibi International University 4-2 Speranza FC Takatsuki
JFA Academy Fukushima 5-0 Norddea Hokkaido
Mashiki Renaissance Kumamoto FC 2-7 Hinomoto Gakuen High School

3rd round
INAC Kobe Leonessa 1-0 Waseda University
AS Elfen Sayama FC 1-0 Fukuoka J. Anclas
JEF United Chiba 2-0 Ehime FC
Tokiwagi Gakuken High School 1-3 Okayama Yunogo Belle
Albirex Niigata 7-0 Hoo High School
Kibi International University 3-4 Urawa Reds
Iga FC Kunoichi 2-0 JFA Academy Fukushima
Hinomoto Gakuen High School 0-5 Nippon TV Beleza

Quarterfinals
Iga FC Kunoichi 0-1 Nippon TV Beleza
JEF United Chiba 0-2 Okayama Yunogo Belle
Albirex Niigata 1-0 Urawa Reds
INAC Kobe Leonessa 2-0 AS Elfen Sayama FC

Semifinals
INAC Kobe Leonessa 4-1 Okayama Yunogo Belle
Albirex Niigata 2-1 Nippon TV Beleza

Final
INAC Kobe Leonessa 3-0 Albirex Niigata
INAC Kobe Leonessa won the championship.

References

Empress's Cup
2011 in Japanese women's football